Benjamin F. W. Sargent the “Brooklyn Chowder Surfer” (born October 26, 1977) is an American celebrity chef, restaurateur, television personality and artist. Chef, designer and previous owner of Hurricane Hopeful and Surf Bar both in Williamsburg, Brooklyn, New York City.

Sargent has appeared on Food Network television program Throwdown! with Bobby Flay, as well as Martha Stewart American Chefs segment on The Fine Living Network. Sargent was also a contestant in Art Race, a twelve-part series airing on the Sky Arts Channel in the UK.

Ben Sargent was born to Claudia and William Sargent in Cambridge, Massachusetts where he was raised through high school. Sargent attended the Commonwealth School in Boston, Massachusetts and later Skidmore College where he studied Fine Arts.

Sargent graduated Skidmore with a Bachelor of Science and a concentration in studio art. He opened Hurricane Hopeful in 2001 a seafood restaurant specializing in his famous chowders and lobster rolls. The restaurant was based on his upbringing in Cape Cod and a love for fishing, surfing and cold water.  Sargent opened another restaurant just two years later called Surf Bar also with his Surf inspired menu.

Sargent lived in Puerto Rico and St. John for some time where he worked in a Chinese Restaurant and taught surfing to children. Sargent attended the French Culinary Institute in Restaurant Management in 2007.  The Brooklynchowdersurfer.com was launched soon afterward as a home to Sargent's culinary adventures out on the road.  In 2009 Ben founded the Brooklyn Fishing Derby: a competitive fishing derby in Brooklyn New York that runs every October for a month and a half. Sargent is also the host of a radio show on Heritage Radio Network called Catch IT, Cook IT, & Eat IT. Currently Ben hosts a number of food events such as the National Chowder Cook Off in Newport, Rhode Island. He has taken his love of food and travel and displayed his many food-inspired images throughout NY galleries, including a solo show at the George Billis Gallery, on July 8, 2008.

In 2010, he is hosting a show on Cooking Network called Hook, Line, and Dinner.

In 2011, he appeared on the Food Network show 'Chopped' episode entitled 'Chard & True'. He was chopped in the first (appetizer) round, for "lack of octopus and poor execution of his dish".

Sargent is currently working on a book of images and chowder recipes inspired by his travels and his Catch It, Cook It, & Eat It approach to life! He lives in Brooklyn, New York in his studio where you can visit for a lobster roll on most days.

References

1977 births
Living people
American male chefs
American television chefs
Artists from Boston
Skidmore College alumni
People from Cambridge, Massachusetts
Commonwealth School alumni